The Lehigh and Hudson River Railway (L&HR) was the smallest of the six railroads that were merged into Conrail in 1976. It was a bridge line running northeast–southwest across northwestern New Jersey, connecting the line to the Poughkeepsie Bridge at Maybrook, New York with Easton, Pennsylvania, where it interchanged with various other companies.

History

The roots of the L&HR begin with the founding of the Warwick Valley Railroad.
The Warwick Valley Railroad was organized March 8, 1860 by a group of local dairymen and business owners led by Grinnell Burt (1822-1901) as a means of connecting the mainline of the New York and Erie Rail Road at Greycourt, New York southwest to Warwick, New York. It opened in 1862 and was operated as a branch of the broad-gauged Erie.

The Pequest and Wallkill Railroad was chartered by 1870 to build an extension in New Jersey, running from Belvidere on the Delaware River and Belvidere Delaware Railroad northeast to the New York state line. The Lehigh and Hudson River Railroad was chartered later as a competitor, planning to build from Belvidere to McAfee, with the Wawayanda Railroad running the rest of the way to the state line and to a connection with the Warwick Valley Railroad. 

In April/May 1881, the three companies merged to form a new Lehigh and Hudson River Railroad and on April 1, 1882, the Warwick Valley Railroad joined, forming the Lehigh and Hudson River Railway (L&HR). Grinnell Burt would serve as the president of the newly consolidated line, as he had with the WVRR, up until his death in 1901 and would be instrumental in progressing the L&HR to become a "link in a great chain" of transportation in the northeast.

In the meantime, the Sussex Railroad had built a branch from Hamburg to South Vernon (McAfee); the L&HR bought this around 1881. The Warwick Valley Railroad had built an extension southwest to McAfee in March 1880, and the full line opened August 14, 1882, connecting Belvidere, New Jersey to Greycourt, New York.

For several years, the L&HR carried freight from its western connections to Greycourt where the Erie operated a branch to the car floats at Newburgh, New York. These car floats across the Hudson River served as a vital rail link to New England. However, by the 1880's this lane was already being made obsolete by the planned construction of the Poughkeepsie Bridge and an all rail route across the Hudson. Sensing the opportunity, the Orange County Railroad was chartered as an L&HR line on November 28, 1888 and opened the following year, extending the line northeast from Greycourt to Burnside where Trackage rights were obtained over a short piece of the New York, Ontario and Western Railway from the junction at Burnside west to the major junction at Campbell Hall. Shortly thereafter, the line was extended further north to Maybrook. At Maybrook, the line junctioned with the Central New England Railway, who would build an enormous staging yard for trains continuing east via the Poughkeepsie Bridge over the Hudson River to New England. 

The South Easton and Phillipsburg Railroad of New Jersey, and the South Easton and Phillipsburg Railroad of Pennsylvania was organized on July 25, 1889 to build a bridge over the Delaware River between Easton, Pennsylvania and Phillipsburg, New Jersey. The former built 460' on the New Jersey side, while the latter built 850' on the Pennsylvania side. Bridge construction began on November 19, 1889, and concluded the following year on October 2. "The South Easton and Phillipsburg Railroad of New Jersey and South Easton and Phillipsburg of Pennsylvania were consolidated with the Lehigh and Hudson River Railway on April 2, 1912. Subsequently, the L&HR obtained trackage rights over 13 miles of the Pennsylvania Railroad's (PRR) Belvidere Delaware Railroad between Phillipsburg and Belvidere;once the bridge was completed, the L&HR had a continuous line from Maybrook to Easton. At Easton, an interchange could be made with the Central Railroad of New Jersey and Lehigh Valley Railroad, while interchange with the PRR was at Phillipsburg.

In 1905, the L&HR eventually obtained trackage rights over the Delaware, Lackawanna and Western Railroad's (DL&W) Sussex Railroad from the junction at Andover south to Port Morris, where it interchanged with the main line of the DL&W.

The Mine Hill Railroad was the only branch built. It ran south from a junction at Franklin, New Jersey to the mines of the New Jersey Zinc Company at Sterling Hill, New Jersey.

From October 1912 until January 1916, the L&HR hosted the PRR's Federal Express passenger trains on the Poughkeepsie Bridge Route between Phillipsburg and Maybrook. With the completion of the Hell Gate Bridge in New York City on September 9, 1917, the Federal Express resumed service via Penn Station and the New Haven Line direct.

Operations
At its peak, L&HR stretched 72 miles between Belvidere and Maybrook with trackage rights on the PRR's Belvidere Delaware Railroad from Belvidere to Phillipsburg, New Jersey, across its own bridge over the Delaware River to Easton, Pennsylvania, thence via trackage rights over the CNJ to their Allentown yards. 

The main purpose of the L&HR act as an extremely important "bridge line" forwarding traffic from the coal and manufacturing regions to New England via the Poughkeepsie Railroad Bridge. Because nearly 100% of its ownership stake was split between the larger railroads that the line interchanged with, and with none having a controlling interest, the L&HR could rely on steady business forwarding this freight while maintaining independent control. The railroad ran almost exclusively through trains between Allentown and Maybrook with some exceptions. As the L&HR was built along a length of the Great Appalachian Valley, grades were relatively mild and long flat stretches of rail made speeds of over 60mph common. The L&HR was an extremely efficient operation and it was possible to make the full run in less that 3 and a half hours. With the exception of a short portion of double-track at Belvidere, the entire line was single-tracked with occasional passing sidings every 5-10 miles to handle the high volume of trains. Due to this streamlined operation, trains out of Allentown ran directly to Maybrook without having to be switched or otherwise handled as almost of the freight was destined to for the Poughkeepsie Bridge and New England. Trains destined to Allentown would have to be re-blocked in Warwick for the connecting carriers such as the DL&W, LV, Reading, and PRR. The DL&W interchange at Port Morris via trackage rights on the Sussex Branch at Andover Jct. proved to be incredibly important and a source of much of the L&HR's business. 

Online business, once the very impetus for the original construction of the Warwick Valley Railroad, became increasingly over time, a much smaller part of the L&HR's business and operations. With a few exceptions, there were no major online heavy industries besides the dozens of creameries and ice houses that dotted the line along its entire length. The dairy industry was especially strong in Warren, Sussex, and Orange Counties where the L&HR serviced numerous farming communities and forwarded their products to the interchange with the Erie and Greycourt where they would then be sent to market in New York City. As trucks began to replace rail as the preferred method of shipping for dairy products, this business all but dried up by the late 1930's. The L&HR was also an important supplier of coal for these communities serving as a link to the anthracite mining regions of Pennsylvania via their connections with the DL&W and CNJ. However, when home heating oil began to replace coal as the primary method to heat homes, the L&HR ceased not only local coal deliveries, but saw a reduction in the volume of coal cars destined for New England via Maybrook.

There were several Limestone quarries and gravel pits along the line in New Jersey including at Limecrest and McAfee, but the largest online customer was the New Jersey Zinc Company at Franklin, New Jersey. Zinc ore was a major source of revenue and carloads of zinc would be sent via the L&HR to the massive Zinc mills at Palmerton, Pennsylvania. The mine was so large in fact that Franklin was once home to three railroads; the L&HR, NYS&W until 1958, and the DL&W until 1934. Although the L&HR owned very few freight cars of its own, they did have a notable fleet of zinc hoppers. A local job out of Warwick would run down to Franklin every day to switch the Zinc mine as well as local industries along the Mine Hill Railroad until the mine finally closed its doors in 1954. 

With the exception of the Federal Express between 1912 and 1916, passenger operations were always a minor part of the business. Service would be truncated several times over the course of the late 1920's and 1930's with the rising popularity of the automobile until the only portion of the line that retained service was the original Warwick Valley line between Warwick and a connection with the Erie Railroad at Greycourt. July 8, 1939 would be the last passenger train for the L&HR as it had been petitioning New York State to discontinue the service since at least 1938.

The L&HR was headquartered and dispatched out of Warwick, New York and had their locomotive servicing facilities there off River Street. These yards were built between 1907-1910 in order to handle the increase in traffic brought on by the opening of the DL&W interchange. At its peak, the yard included a 16-stall roundhouse, turntable, coaling tower, machine shop, scale, transfer shed, and an 8-track classification yard for sorting inbound trains from Maybrook. Earlier rail yards included one on Elm Street and the original terminus of the Warwick Valley Railroad at South Street. There was also a small classification yard and engine servicing terminal at Hudson Yard just north of Phillipsburg along the PRR's Bel-Del, a yard to service New Jersey Zinc at Franklin, and an interchange yard shared with the Erie at Greycourt.

Motive Power

During the Warwick Valley years and up until 1880, the railroad operated as a branch of the Erie Railway's broad gauge system, but when the Erie converted to standard gauge in 1880, the Warwick Valley bought their only two locomotives, a pair of 4-4-0's, from Cooke Locomotive and Machine Works. From the early years of the L&HR up until the turn of the century, most of their locomotives were bought from Cooke. 

From 1894 until the end of steam in 1950, all of their locomotives were built by the Baldwin Locomotive Works. This included several dozen 4-6-0 and 2-8-0 camelback locomotives built between 1904 and 1908 to coincide with the increase in traffic from the Port Morris connection. L&HR power upgraded in the years during and after WWI locomotives during this time were noted for their Wootten fireboxes; designed to burn the harder anthracite coal. By the mid 1930's all of its camelbacks would be scrapped, save for 3 that were kept to handle the local turn from Warwick to Greycourt as well as the Franklin Drill which could not handle heavier locomotives on the Mine Hill Branch. As a result of traffic surges from WWII, the L&HR bought their last steam locomotives from Baldwin in 1944; a trio of 4-8-2 Mountains that, due to war-time restrictions, were virtual copies of the Boston & Maine's R1d design

Lehigh & Hudson River Railway Locomotive Roster; 1950

Despite having been a customer of Baldwin since 1894, when the end of steam came in December 1950, the replacements would be exclusively from ALCO. The L&HR bought their first 11 RS-3's early in 1950 with two additional RS-3s being purchased in 1951 bringing their total to 13 (numbered 1-13). Commonly short on power on-hand, these would be the only locomotives for nearly a dozen years until L&HR began acquiring newer Alco C-420s in 1963, some of which were acquired by trading in older RS-3s. By 1972 the L&HR would eventually sell off all of their RS-3's leaving them with 9 C-420's numbered 21-29.

http://www.northeast.railfan.net/lhr_rstr.html

Bankruptcy
A profitable railroad for nearly its entire existence, The L&HR filed for Chapter 7 bankruptcy on April 19, 1972, owing partly to Penn Central's decision to operate over other routes in order to avoid the aging Poughkeepsie Bridge.

Post-bankruptcy, the L&HR continued to operate a nocturnal daily freight. During the mid-1970s, the L&HR became part of a proposal to run "Bunny Ski Trains" between Hoboken, New Jersey, and the Playboy Resort (Great Gorge) in Vernon, New Jersey. The proposed service, which would have run on weekends during the winter, would have retrieved passengers westbound along the Erie Lackawanna Railway's (EL) Morristown Line to Netcong, New Jersey, then run along a short section of the remaining Sussex Branch to Andover Junction in Andover, New Jersey, and then northbound along the L&HR to the Penn Central. The service would have utilized EL's new commuter consists, but was met with stiff opposition from EL management, which was anticipating a merger with other north-eastern US railroads and did not want to enter into a venture that it viewed as a potential money-loser. The Bunny Ski Train remained a viable proposal until the remaining vestige of the Sussex Branch was removed in July 1977, after it became clear that it was no longer needed as a connector to the L&HR.

As such, in 1976 the L&HR was merged into Conrail. Subsequently, the section between Belvidere, New Jersey and Sparta, New Jersey (Sparta Junction) was abandoned. The tracks, however, remained in place until approximately 1988, when the right-of-way between these two points was acquired by land developer Jerry Turco from Conrail. Turco had also acquired most of the Lackawanna Cut-Off as part of the same deal. Conrail removed the tracks south of Sparta Junction; however, the section north of that point was already being considered by the New York, Susquehanna & Western (NYS&W) as part of a combined regional freight route with Norfolk Southern Railway (NS). The line from Warwick to Campbell Hall, New York is currently leased to the Middletown and New Jersey Railroad.

The L&HR Today

Approximately 42 miles of the original 72 miles of the original L&HR-built right-of-way is still in place from Limecrest in the township of Sparta, New Jersey to the "new" Hudson Junction within the town of Hamptonburgh, New York.

In New Jersey, the NYS&W owns the L&HR line from Sparta Junction to Pelton Crossing, a point just 3 miles north of the NY state line and at the throat of the former yards in Warwick, New York. At Sparta Junction, where the original line of the NYS&W used to cross the L&HR on a diamond, a connection has been built to allow movement between the former lines. In addition, a daily local job works out of Sparta where numerous industries are serviced by rail including a transload sugar facility, a propane facility, and others. The NYS&W also operates a single road train four times a week between Binghamton and Ridgefield Park, New Jersey which traverses the entirety of the remaining L&HR and is the only regular rail traffic between Sparta and Warwick.

From Pelton Crossing in Warwick to the "new" Hudson Junction in Hamptonburgh, the line is owned by NS which had acquired the line during the breakup of Conrail. The NS-owned portion of the line is known as the "Hudson Secondary" and while owned by the NS, it is dispatched by the NYS&W. Since 2010, the Middletown and New Jersey Railroad  (on a lease from the NS)currently operates and maintains the Hudson Secondary with a semi-daily local from Campbell Hall to Warwick.

In 1988, the NYS&W built a connecting track bypassing Maybrook by curving west onto the former Erie Graham Line (current Metro-North Railroad) at a point just north of Sarah Wells Trail in the town of Hamptonburgh. This bypass eliminated pulling through trains north to Maybrook and running around the train before continuing west through Campbell Hall. As a result of this "new" Hudson Junction, the original three miles of L&HR right-of-way from HJ to Maybrook were abandoned. HJ or Hudson Junction is not to be confused with the original Hudson Junction where the Warwick Valley Railroad to Greycourt met the 1888-built Orange County Railroad (which leapt over the Erie Mainline at Greycourt north to Maybrook). 

South of Limecrest just south of Sparta Junction, the line is abandoned to Belvidere; however the former PRR-owned Bel-Del, L&HR-owned Hudson Yard in Phillipsburg and the L&HR-owned South Easton & Phillipsburg Bridge over the Delaware River are still in service on the Norfolk Southern. 

Although the line had always operated in a west to east orientation from Allentown to Maybrook, the NYS&W operates the line from Sparta to Warwick as east to west.

References

External links

A Lehigh and Hudson River Railway Scrapbook
Black Diamonds to Tidewater – Lehigh & Hudson River Railway
Railroad History Database

 
Defunct New Jersey railroads
Defunct New York (state) railroads
Defunct Pennsylvania railroads
Former Class I railroads in the United States
Railroads transferred to Conrail
Predecessors of Conrail
Railway companies established in 1882
Railway companies disestablished in 1976
American companies established in 1882